Bancang is a community of Kaihui town in Changsha County, Hunan province, China. It is the birthplace of Mao Zedong's second wife, Yang Kaihui.

References

Changsha County
Communities of China